The 2019–20 Logan Cup was the 26th edition of the Logan Cup, a first-class cricket competition in Zimbabwe. The tournament started on 12 December 2019, and was scheduled to finish on 16 February 2020. It featured five franchise teams, including a new team, the Rangers. Mountaineers were the defending champions.

In July 2019, Zimbabwe Cricket was suspended by the International Cricket Council (ICC) due to government interference, with all their international and domestic fixtures put on hold. The suspension was lifted by the ICC in October 2019, meaning their domestic fixtures could go ahead. However, in early January 2020, three sets of fixtures did not take place as scheduled, with Zimbabwe Cricket not providing a reason. The tournament restarted on 29 January 2020, with the Matabeleland Tuskers playing the Mid West Rhinos in Bulawayo. After a break of nearly one month for the 2019–20 Pro50 Championship, the next first-class matches started on 20 February 2020, with two fixtures in Harare.

On 18 March 2020, Zimbabwe Cricket suspended all forms of cricket in the country due to the COVID-19 pandemic. On 4 May 2020, Zimbabwe Cricket voided the tournament due to the pandemic with no winner being declared.

Point table
The following teams competed:

Fixtures

December 2019

January 2020

February 2020

March 2020

References

External links
 Series home at ESPN Cricinfo

Logan Cup
Logan Cup
Logan Cup
Logan Cup
Logan Cup